Stephen Benito DeLuca Jr. (born April 9, 1998) is an American football safety for the St. Louis BattleHawks of the XFL. He played college football at Charlotte.

College career
DeLuca was a member of the Charlotte 49ers for five seasons. He suffered a shoulder injury in the second game of his senior season and utilized a medical redshirt. DeLuca finished his college career with 313 tackles, nine forced fumbles, six fumble recoveries, and 17 passes broken up, all of which are school records, and had four interceptions.

Professional career

Los Angeles Chargers 
DeLuca signed with the Los Angeles Chargers as an undrafted free agent on May 3, 2021. He was waived on August 31, 2021, during final roster cuts and was re-signed to the practice squad the next day.  DeLuca was elevated to the active roster on December 12, 2021, for the team's Week 14 game against the New York Giants. He signed a reserve/future contract with the Chargers on January 11, 2022.

On August 30, 2022, DeLuca was waived by the Chargers.

St. Louis BattleHawks 
On November 17, 2022, DeLuca was drafted by the St. Louis BattleHawks of the XFL.

References

External links
Charlotte 49ers bio
Los Angeles Chargers bio

1998 births
Living people
Players of American football from Florida
American football safeties
St. Louis BattleHawks players
Los Angeles Chargers players
Charlotte 49ers football players